Christyn Williams (born May 20, 2000) is an American women's basketball player. She was drafted by the Washington Mystics. She played college basketball at the University of Connecticut (UConn). She played in high school for Central Arkansas Christian School in North Little Rock, Arkansas. A five-star recruit and one of the most decorated high school basketball players in history, Williams rose to national acclaim after winning the 2018 WBCA National Player of the Year award, the 2018 Naismith National Player of the Year award the 2018 Gatorade National Player of the Year award, and the 2018 USA Today Player of the Year award.  Williams also was named a McDonald's All-American, where she was named the game's MVP after scoring 22 points and leading the West team to an 82-79 victory. Williams was awarded the Morgan Wootten Award, which is given each year to "the McDonald's All American who best exhibits outstanding character, leadership and the values of a student-athlete in the classroom and the community". Williams was also named to the 2018 Jordan Brand Classic team.

High school career
As a freshman in the 2014-15 season, Williams averaged 18.5 points a game for the Lady Mustangs while helping lead the team to a 28-4 record and an appearance in the state quarterfinals.  The next season as a sophomore Williams carried a heavy load for the team, averaging a career-best 28.5 points per game and leading the team to a runner-up finish in the Arkansas 4A state tournament.  In 2016-17, Williams' junior season, she averaged 26.0 points per game and led the team to a 29-5 record.  The Lady Mustangs finished the season with a loss in the state quarterfinals.  As a senior in 2017-18, Williams and the Lady Mustangs had the best season in school history, finishing with a 36-1 record and winning the 2-4A Conference, 2-4A District, 4A East Region, and 4A State Championships while averaging 26.8 points and 10.4 rebounds per game.  Finishing with 3500 points, Williams ended her career with the second-most points in Arkansas girls basketball history, behind only Lakyn Garrison of Wickes, who played from 2003-2007. Over the course of her career, she led the Lady Mustangs to a 117-24 record, including the Arkansas 4A 2018 state championship.

College career
Williams made her debut for the University of Connecticut in the season opener against Ohio State on November 11, 2018.  She started the game and ended with 7 points, 2 rebounds, 2 assists, and 3 steals in the 85-53 win.  Three weeks later Williams played a large part in the #2-ranked Huskies upsetting the #1-ranked Notre Dame Fighting Irish in South Bend, 89-71.  Williams finished the game with a career-high 28 points.  Williams started all 38 games during her freshman campaign and ended the season averaging 11.7 points, 3.2 rebounds, 2.3 assists, and 1.2 steals per game. The Huskies fell to Notre Dame in the 2019 Final Four, 81-76.

In her sophomore season, which was cut short by the 2019 COVID-19 pandemic, Williams started 31 of the Huskies' 32 games and averaged 14.6 points, 4.9 rebounds, 2.3 assists, and 1.3 steals per game for the 29-3 Huskies.

In October 2020, Williams was named the Big East Preseason Player of the Year before her junior season began.

In the 2020-21 season, Williams played a large role in the Huskies going 28-2, 18-0 during her junior season, with their only losses coming on the road at Arkansas, and in the Final Four vs Arizona.  Williams finished the season averaging 16.3 points, 4.3 rebounds, 2.2 assists, and 1 steal per game.

In 2021-22, Williams’ senior season, UConn went 30-6, 16-1, and made it back to the national championship game for the first time since 2016, before coming up short against South Carolina in Minneapolis.  She averaged 14.2 points, 3.4 rebounds, 2.3 assists, and 1.5 steals per game for the Huskies.

On April 1, 2022, Williams was presented with the Ann Meyers Drysdale Award, which annually recognizes the nation’s top shooting guard.  Williams was the first Husky to win the honor.

On April 6, 2022, Williams announced that she would be entering the 2022 WNBA Draft.

WNBA career

On April 11, 2022, Williams was drafted by the Washington Mystics in the second round with the 14th overall pick. However, it was reported that Williams got hurt during practice and will have to undergo surgery for her knee injury. Thus, she was unable to play during the 2022 season.

References

External links
 

2000 births
Living people
American women's basketball players
Basketball players from Arkansas
McDonald's High School All-Americans
Sportspeople from Little Rock, Arkansas
UConn Huskies women's basketball players
Guards (basketball)
Pan American Games medalists in basketball
Pan American Games gold medalists for the United States
Basketball players at the 2019 Pan American Games
Pan American Games 3x3 basketball players
Medalists at the 2019 Pan American Games
Washington Mystics draft picks